Stewart Greacen (born 31 March 1982) is a Scottish retired footballer who played as a central defender.

Greacen started his career as a youth player with Rangers, before making his first competitive appearances with Airdrieonians. Following only three league games, he was signed by the at-the-time Scottish Premier League side Livingston where he spent most of his time on loan at Queen of the South and Morton.

After leaving Livi, he played for Forfar Athletic before moving on to become captain at Morton where he had previously been on loan.

Career
Born in Lanark, Greacen began his senior career at now defunct Airdrieonians and from there he moved to Livingston. Livingston then sent him on loan to Queen of the South and Greenock Morton, where he played in the team that was relegated from the Scottish Second Division in the 2001–02 season. Livingston released Greacen in 2003 and he was immediately signed by Forfar Athletic. He played the second half of the 2002–03 season at Forfar on a short-term contract. At the end of the season Forfar offered Greacen a long-term deal which he rejected in favour of a deal at Morton. The main reason for this was that Morton offered a full-time contract in comparison to Forfar's part-time contract.

Greacen plays at centre back in the Morton defence. He is a tall commanding defender with a strong physical presence. He is good in the air and this helps in both an attacking and defensive way as he often scores from headers at set pieces. At 24 years old, Greacen became Greenock Morton's captain.

In May 2008, it was announced that Greacen had rejected a new contract from Morton and was being tracked by rival Scottish First Division sides Dunfermline Athletic, Queen of the South and Livingston.

Greacen was Morton's Player of the Year for 2008–2009.

On 22 December 2010, Greacen was released by Morton after nearly 250 appearances over two spells from the club.

He was on trial at Dundee, where he was eligible to play in a maximum of three league games – he however could not be signed due to their current transfer embargo.

He, therefore, chose the safe option of playing in the Airtricity Premier League with championship favourites Derry City hoping to gain a move to a bigger club in the summer.

He linked up Glentoran on 21 December 2011 but was released from his contract at the end of January 2012 as he wished to play full-time football again and has found the travelling from Scotland and not being able to train with the Glentoran squad an issue. He then joined up again with former club Derry City for training, admitting that he was in talks to sign a new contract. He subsequently rejoined them.

At the end of the 2014–15 season it was announced that due to an ongoing knee injury, Greacen would leave Stenhousemuir and retire from professional football.

Honours
Greenock Morton
Scottish Football League Second Division (1): 2006–07

Derry City
League of Ireland Cup (1): 2011
FAI Cup (1): 2012

See also
Greenock Morton F.C. season 2008-09 | 2009–10 | 2010–11

References

External links

1982 births
Living people
Scottish footballers
Airdrieonians F.C. (1878) players
Livingston F.C. players
Queen of the South F.C. players
Forfar Athletic F.C. players
Greenock Morton F.C. players
Scottish Football League players
Association football central defenders
Rangers F.C. players
Dundee F.C. players
Glentoran F.C. players
Derry City F.C. players
Stenhousemuir F.C. players
NIFL Premiership players
League of Ireland players
League of Ireland XI players
Sportspeople from Lanark
Footballers from South Lanarkshire